Geoff or Geoffrey Richards may refer to:

 Geoff Richards (footballer) (1929–2014), English football winger
 Geoff Richards (rugby union) (born 1951), former rugby union player and coach
 Geoff Richards (professor), Director of AO Research and Development at the AO Foundation
Geoffrey Richards (cross country skier) in Cross-country skiing at the 2011 Canada Winter Games

See also
Jeff Richards (disambiguation)